Aflou is a district in Laghouat Province, Algeria. It was named after its capital, Aflou.

Municipalities
The district is further divided into many municipalities:

Aflou
Sebgag
Sidi Bouzid

References 

Districts of Laghouat Province